The 2010–11 Serbian Cup season is fifth season of the Serbian national football tournament. The competition started on 1 September 2010 and concluded with the Final on 11 May 2011. FK Partizan won the title 2–1 over FK Vojvodina in controversial fashion. After a series of disputed referee decisions against Vojvodina, the team walked off the pitch and refused to finish the match, leading Partizan to be declared the winner as time expired.

However, later this decision was revised pending further investigation. On Monday, May 16th 2011, the Cup final match result is registered with a Vojvodina forfeit (0:3 victory for Partizan).

Preliminary round
A preliminary round was held in order to reduce the number of teams competing in the next round to 32 and featured 14 teams from Serbian lower divisions. The matches were played on 1 September 2010.

|}
Note: Roman numerals in brackets denote the league tier the clubs participate in during the 2010–11 season.

Round of 32
In this round entered seven winners from the previous round as well as all 16 teams from Serbian Superliga from 2009–10 and 9 teams from Serbian First League from 2009–10. Draw was held on September 10, 2010. The matches were played on 22 September, 28 September and 6 October 2010.

|}
Note: Roman numerals in brackets denote the league tier the clubs participate in during the 2010–11 season.

Round of 16
This round consists of 16 winners from previous round of competition. Draw was held on October 15, 2010. Matches were played on October 27, 2010. In case of a tie winner was decided by penalty shoot outs.

|}
Note: Roman numerals in brackets denote the league tier the clubs participate in during the 2010–11 season.

Quarter-finals
This round consists of 8 winners from previous round of competition. Draw was held on October 29, 2010. Matches will be played on November 10, 2010. In case of a tie winner will be decided by penalty shoot outs.

|}
Note: Roman numerals in brackets denote the league tier the clubs participate in during the 2010–11 season.

Semi-finals

The semi-final will take place in two legs, on March 16 and April 6. The round consists of two-legged ties. Draw was held on December 1, 2010. No teams were seeded.

|}

First legs

Second legs

Final

1 The match was abandoned in the 83rd minute with Partizan leading 2–1 when Vojvodina walked off to protest the quality of the officiating. Originally, this was declared the final score and the Cup was awarded to Partizan, but on May 16th, 2011, after further investigation from Serbian FA concerning the match, the result was officially registered as a 3–0 win to Partizan.

References

External links
 Official site

2010–11
Cup
2010–11 domestic association football cups